Wilma Labate (born 4 December 1949) is an Italian film director and screenwriter.

Born in Rome, Labate started her career as a television director, then in the 1980s she worked in the field of documentary filmmaking industry.

She made her feature film debut in 1992 with Ambrogio, for which she was nominated best new director at the 1994 Nastri d'Argento.  In 1996, her film La mia generazione won the Grolla d'oro for best film and was the Italian candidate in the race for the 1997 Academy Awards for Best Foreign Film. Her last film, Signorina Effe, premiered at the 2007 Turin Film Festival.

Labate is also an author and in 2005 co-wrote with Fausto Bertinotti the autobiographical book Il ragazzo con la maglietta a strisce.

References

External links 
 

1949 births
Film directors from Rome
Living people
Italian screenwriters
Italian television directors